al-Musawi is an Arabic title indicating a person descended from Musa al-Kazim, the seventh of the Twelve Shi'a Imams. Family members from this dynasty are amongst the most respected and well-known Muslims. Members of this family are referred to by the anglicized version of their name. Some Musawis of the subcontinent also take the last name of Kazmi (الكاظمي). Some Musawis migrated from Mecca and Medina, Saudi Arabia to a small village where their ancestor Musa Al-Kadhim is buried in Baghdad, Iraq (Kadhimain).

The al-Musawi family is one of the largest and most influential families in the world. All Musawi's are descendants from the Musa Al-Kadhim son of Imam Ja'far al-Sadiq, their bloodline tracing all the way through each of the first six Twelve Imams, to the first; Imam Ali Bin Abi Talib, along with his wife Fatimah, the daughter of the Muhammad. Members of the al-Musawi family are referred to with the title Sayyid, As an honorific title, it denotes males accepted as the direct descendants of the Muhammad. Members are mainly Shi'a Muslims found mainly in Iraq, Iran, Lebanon and other parts of the world.

The roots of the Al-Musawi family comes from the Head tribe of Banu Hashim, a clan of Quraysh, which makes them Adnani Arabs or Northern Arabs who are originated from Ibrahim through his son Ishmael in Mesopotamia, now Iraq, in the ancient city of Ur, near Nasiriyah, in Southern Iraq.

Prominent members

In the GCC countries 

 Sayyid Ala Sayyid Mohammad Sayyid Ahmed Sayyid Abed Al-Musawi - Is a Kuwaiti oral and maxillofacial surgeon and former university teacher. Grandson of Sayyid Ahmed Sayyid Abed Al-Musawi, former member of the Kuwaiti government. He has a street in Kuwait named after him.
Sulaimaan Rabi' Al-Musawi - (1812- 1895) A renowned Kuwaiti teacher who taught Mubarak the Great the Emir of Kuwait. He opened a school in the Grand Mosque of Kuwait.
Mohammed Mehdi al-Qazwini - renowned religious scholar, proposed the idea of the third wall of Kuwait in 1920.
Muhammad Hassan Al-Musawi - (1912 - 12 January 1995) was one of the most prominent and pioneering Kuwaiti educators. He was the grandson of Sayyid Sulaimaan Rabi' Al-Musawi. He was chosen as the principal of the Jafari School in Kuwait and introduced English and Arabic Literature and Grammar to the school. He served from 1942 to 1973 earning him the title of "The Educator of Generations". He developed and re-organised the curricula of different subjects including Science and PE, introduced the Unified Examinations system,  Seat Numbers, School Reports (Transcripts), all of which are still used across all public schools in Kuwait. When he got sick and was offered to be sent abroad for treatment, he refused saying "I don't want to die in a strange land."
Muhammad Baqir al-Muhri - (1948 - 2015) was one of the most prominent scholars in Kuwait's history. He was a deputy of about 15 marja', the founder of the Islamic-Christian Relationships Council, the founder of The Congregation of Muslim Scholars in Kuwait, Imam of Imam Ali Mosque in Kuwait, politician and newspaper writer, and the author of The Philosophy and secrets of Hajj book.
 Dhiyaa Al-Musawi - Bahraini author and cleric.
 Hussain Al-Musawi - Kuwaiti footballer and one of Al-Arabi SC top scorers.

In Iraq 
Abul-Hasan Muhammad ibn Al-Hussein Al-Musawi "ash-Sharif al-Radhi" - (~930-977 CE) A Muslim scholar and poet who was born in Baghdad. His most famous book is Nahj al-Balaghah which is a collection of Imam Ali's sayings and speeches.

 Nasrallah al-Haeri - Religious scholar and poet, played an important role in inner-Islamic ecumenical dialogue during the Ottoman era.

Madhiha Hassan Al-Musawi - An aid worker for the Iraqi government who some people have begun calling the "Mother Teresa of Baghdad"
Husain al-Radi - General secretary of the Iraqi Communist Party, killed after torture in Qasr Al-Nihaya in 1963 (Radi is of Musawi descent)
Musa al-Musawi - Known for writing polemical revisionist texts on Islam
Ibrahim al-Jaafari - Politician who was Prime Minister of Iraq in the Iraqi Transitional Government from 2005 to 2006, following the January 2005 election. He served as Minister of Foreign Affairs from 2014 to 2018.
Hassan al-Qazwini - Founder and leader of the Islamic Center of America in Dearborn Heights, Michigan, representing the Twelver Shi'a branch of Islam

In Lebanon 
Abbas al-Musawi - (1952 - 16 February 1992) An influential Muslim scholar and cleric.
Husayn Al-Musawi - Lebanese who founded the now-dissolved Shi'a Islamist militia Islamic Amal in 1982.
Ibrahim Mousawi - Lebanese journalist and media relations officer.

In Iran 
Ruhollah Khomeini - (September 1902 – 3 June 1989) An Iranian religious leader and scholar, politician, and leader of the 1979 Iranian Revolution. (Khomeini is of Musawi descent, he descended from the Safavid dynasty.
Abu al-Qasim al-Khoei - One of the most influential Twelver Shi'a Islamic scholars of the 20th century.
Mohammad Ali Mousavi Jazayeri - Iranian Twelver Shi'a cleric, was the previous representative of Wali-Faqih in Khuzestan province + Ahwaz Imam of Friday.
Abdorrahim Musavi - Chief of the Joint Staff of the Iranian armed forces.
Mujtaba Musavi Lari - Shi'a Twelver Islamic scholar.
Ali Mousavi - Iranian football player

Indian Subcontinent 
Hamid Hussain Musavi - was a leading scholar of his time in India.

Al-Musawi related families
 Al Sayyid Kassem
Al-Khorsan
Mahmodawi
Kazmi
Gardēzī Sadaat
Madrouni
Al Gharawi
Sadr
Safavi
Al-Shammaa
Al-Hashemi
Shahristani
Sharif al-Ulama
Al Husseini
 Al-Mirakoni
 Some members of the Almazidi family
 Nasrallah
 Dhiya al-Din
 Sharaf Al Din
 Al Shouki

References

See also
Safavid dynasty

 
Arab families
Lebanese families
Iranian families
Hashemite people